"Calm Down Dearest" is the third single released from English singer Jamie T's debut studio album, Panic Prevention (2007). The song was written and produced by Jamie T, with additional production from Jason Cox and Puffy Combes. The song peaked at  9 on the UK Singles Chart in January 2007.

Track listings
UK 7-inch single disc 1
A. "Calm Down Dearest"
B. "Calm Down Dearest" (acoustic version)

UK 7-inch single disc 2
A. "Calm Down Dearest"
B. "Feel Me"

UK CD single
 "Calm Down Dearest"
 "Fox News"

Charts

References

External links
 Article about the song on thishereboogie.com

2006 songs
2007 singles
Jamie T songs
Virgin Records singles